Warshi Union is a union of Mirzapur Upazila, Tangail District, Bangladesh. It is situated  10.5 km south of Mirzapur and 38.5 km southeast of Tangail, The district headquarters.

Warshi Natpukur: Warshi Natpukur is situated in the centre of the village. This place is also known by old name "warshi noulapukur". This is the place where all kind of cultural programmes are arranged by the village people.

Demographics
According to Population Census 2011 performed by Bangladesh Bureau of Statistics, The total population of Warshi union is 27611. There are 6456 households in total.

Education
The literacy rate of Warshi Union is 59.8% (Male-63.9%, Female-56.3%).

See also
 Union Councils of Tangail District

References

Populated places in Dhaka Division
Populated places in Tangail District
Unions of Mirzapur Upazila